Studio: Selected Studio Recordings 1986–1995 is an album by the Canadian alt-country band Cowboy Junkies, released in 1996.

Album information 
It is a greatest hits compilation of singles from the band's albums on RCA Records, and their last official release for that label. (Two compilations, Best of the Cowboy Junkies and Platinum & Gold Collection, were released later by the label in the 2000s without the band's participation.) The band's first studio album on Geffen Records, Lay It Down, was released earlier the same year, however Studio also includes the song "A Common Disaster" from Lay it Down. Studio is also the only official Cowboy Junkies album to include the band's studio version of David Wiffen's "Lost My Driving Wheel", which the band recorded for the 1993 benefit album Born to Choose. The song does, however, appear on some import versions of Black Eyed Man.

Track listing

References

External links 

1996 greatest hits albums
Cowboy Junkies albums
RCA Records compilation albums